fairytale is the 3rd single by Japanese girl group Kalafina, featuring Wakana Ootaki, Keiko Kubota and Hikaru Masai. The title track was used as the theme song for the sixth chapter of Kara no Kyoukai while "serenato" has no tie-in to Kara no Kyoukai whatsoever.

Track listing
Catalog Number
SECL-735
Track listing
fairytale
serenato
sprinter -instrumental-

Charts

References

2008 singles
Songs written by Yuki Kajiura
Kalafina songs
SME Records singles
2008 songs
Japanese film songs
Songs written for animated films